Sef Fa'agase (born 5 March 1991), is an Australian rugby union player of Samoan descent. His usual position is prop. He plays for the New England Free Jacks of Major League Rugby (MLR).

Early life
Fa'agase was born in Auckland, New Zealand but moved to Australia as a young boy with his family. He played junior rugby union for the Beaudesert Warriors from the age of 12 to 15, Berrinba East State School where he spent a brief period playing rugby league and attended Shailer Park State High School.

Rugby career
Fa'agase played for Wests Bulldogs in the Queensland Premier Rugby competition before being selected for the ARU's National Academy in 2012. He played for Reds A in the Pacific Rugby Cup in 2013 and 2014, and joined the University of Queensland Rugby Club which won the premiership in 2014.

The  coach Nick Stiles recruited Fa'agase to play in the 2014 National Rugby Championship. He became a regular starter for the team during the season and was the starting tighthead prop in Brisbane's grand final win against Perth Spirit.

Fa'agase made his Super Rugby debut against the Brumbies on 12 February as the ' replacement tighthead prop.

Super Rugby statistics

References

1991 births
Australian rugby union players
Australian sportspeople of Samoan descent
Rugby union props
Queensland Reds players
Brisbane City (rugby union) players
Queensland Country (NRC team) players
Rugby union players from Brisbane
Living people
Canterbury rugby union players
Highlanders (rugby union) players
Wellington rugby union players
Yokohama Canon Eagles players
Otago rugby union players
New England Free Jacks players
Melbourne Rebels players